Bradbury Norton (23 August 1834 – 21 February 1917) was an English lawyer and amateur cricketer.

Norton was born at Town Malling in Kent. He played in ten first-class cricket matches for Kent County Cricket Club between his debut in 1858 and his final match for the side in 1866. Norton's brother, William South Norton, was captain of the Kent team at the time and honorary secretary of the county club formed at Maidstone in 1859. As well as playing for Kent, Norton also made appearances for the Gentlemen of Kent between 1860 and 1869. Another brother, Selby Norton, made a single first-class appearance for Kent as an emergency replacement in 1863 and a cousin, William Norton, played three times for the county side.

Professionally Norton was a lawyer working in Kent. He died in 1917 at Taltal in Chile aged 82.

References

External links

1834 births
1917 deaths
English cricketers
Kent cricketers
English solicitors
19th-century English lawyers